Tales from the Crapper is a 2004 straight-to-video anthology film that was a spoof of the Tales from the Crypt comics. The film was released by Troma Entertainment.

Plot
Troma Entertainment co-founder and B-movie director and producer Lloyd Kaufman plays the Crap Keeper. He presents the viewers with two horror stories that contain gore, nudity, fat men, talking penises, lesbian scenes, vampires, UFOs, and appearances by porn star Ron Jeremy and the band New Found Glory. The film was purportedly shot over three years with six directors and close to fifteen writers.

Cast

Production
The film started pre-production in early 2001, after a successful digitized web-comic starring Yaniv Sharon entitled Tales From the Crapper hit the Troma website. After the three-part comic was done, Troma President Lloyd Kaufman wanted a real series on their website to be made. A contract was done with India Allen, who had recently produced and directed the film The Rowdy Girls which Troma distributed. The budget for the first season was $200,000 USD.

After more than a year of production, Troma received the footage that was shot and it was unwatchable. In some cases, there was missing sound, the camera-work seemed unprofessional. All of the episodes were unfinished. Lloyd Kaufman and Michael Herz were even more displeased when they found out that the entire budget was gone. In order to salvage the project, Lloyd Kaufman got former Troma alumni to re-work the script and find new uses for the footage shot. In 2003, re-shooting began both in Los Angeles and New York with Kaufman overseeing production. Gabriel Friedman, Troma's editor at the time, had made a list of the shots that were needed for the rewrites that they were working on. Despite Friedman and Kaufman being clear on what to do, many problems arose as well in the re-shoot with incompetent crew members. This led to years of post-production.  In order to make scenes fit together and due to the lack of sound on most of the footage, many scenes had to be re-dubbed. Both segments, which started out as horror films with a slice of comedy, had now become over-the-top comedy.

See also
 Troma Entertainment
 Lloyd Kaufman
 Tales from the Crypt

References

External links
 
 

American comedy horror films
American direct-to-video films
2000s comedy horror films
American anthology films
2004 direct-to-video films
2004 films
Films directed by Chad Ferrin
Films directed by Lloyd Kaufman
Troma Entertainment films
Parodies of horror
2000s English-language films
2000s American films